Retta Nagala is a village in Muzaffarnagar district in the Indian state of Uttar Pradesh, situated on the Roorkee Road (NH-58), with a population between 5,000 and 6,000.

Villages in Muzaffarnagar district